Maryam Periera is a 2018 Pakistani drama serial aired on TV One. The drama stars Ahsan Khan and Sadia Khan. The drama was first aired 10 October 2018.

Plot
The serial focuses on the minorities in Pakistan and tells the story of Christian girl named Maryam Periera who teaches in a college to support her family as her father had died.

Cast
Ahsan Khan as Ali Khan
Sadia Khan as Maryam Periera
Emmad Irfani  as Sufyan
Rasheed Naz as  Hakim Khan (Ali Khan's father)
Ayub Khoso
Shaheen Khan as Ayesha
Seemi Raheel  as Maryam Periera's mother
Farhan Iqbal
Ayesha Khan as Bilal's mother
Laila Zuberi
Fariya Hassan as Jenny
Mizna Waqas as Tabassum

References

External links

2018 Pakistani television series debuts
Pakistani drama television series
2019 Pakistani television series endings
Urdu-language television shows